Haskel Lookstein (born March 21, 1932) is an American Modern Orthodox Rabbi who serves as the rabbi emeritus of Congregation Kehilath Jeshurun on the Upper East Side of Manhattan. Lookstein served as the rabbi of Congregation Kehilath Jeshurun from 1958 through 2015, and as the principal of the Ramaz School from 1966 through 2015.

Early years and personal life
Lookstein started first grade at the Ramaz School in 1937, the year it was established by his father, Rabbi Joseph Lookstein, who was then senior rabbi of Congregation Kehilath Jeshurun. The school was named in honor of Joseph Lookstein's grandfather-in-law and predecessor in the pulpit, Rabbi Moses Zevulun Margolies.

As a child in the 1940s and 1950s, Lookstein would maintain a "shul scorecard", tracking the weather, the subject of his father's sermon, the details of any special occasions, and the number of congregants in attendance, which hovered in the 200s, depending on the subject of the sermon.

He married the former Audrey Katz on June 21, 1959.

Education
Lookstein received his undergraduate degree from Columbia University, and took a master's degree at Yeshiva University. After receiving his rabbinic ordination from Rabbi Isaac Elchanan Theological Seminary in 1958, he was offered pulpits in Detroit and at the Sephardic Temple in Cedarhurst, New York. He had also been offered a position as assistant rabbi serving under his father, Rabbi Joseph Lookstein, a choice that he was warned against. In the end he decided for his home congregation, and was installed as assistant rabbi at Congregation Kehilath Jeshurun, serving under his father, on June 14, 1958.

Work
In 1958, Rabbi Lookstein began serving as Assistant Rabbi of Congregation Kehilath Jeshurun. In 1966, The New York Times devoted an article to Lookstein's May 14 sermon on the weekly Torah portion of Behar / Bechukotai, in which Lookstein described the Talmud as a model for a modern civil rights manual. In the sermon, he characterized the 25th chapter of the Book of Leviticus, which is read at the beginning of Parashat Behar, as "one of the most profound sources" for the social consciousness of religion during the Civil Rights era, and went on to explicate the relevance of the Talmud, noting, for example, that it holds that no man is free if he does not have economic opportunity or the right to live where he chooses.

Also in 1966, Lookstein began his tenure as principal of the Ramaz School.

Rabbi Lookstein's political activism began with repeated visits to the former Soviet Union, and numerous rallies on behalf of Natan Sharansky and Soviet Jewry, and it continued with activism on behalf of the Jews of Israel and worldwide.

Following the death of his father, in July 1979, Rabbi Lookstein assumed the position of senior rabbi of Congregation Kehilath Jeshurun. Filled with concern at the responsibility of filling the role served by his father as the congregation's leader, he was reassured after his father's funeral by his mother, who said: "Haskel, you'll sit there; that was dad's seat", and shortly thereafter: "Well, you'll finally have a nice office"; successfully assuaging his worries.

He was selected by Newsweek magazine as the most influential Orthodox pulpit rabbi in the United States in 2008, ranked second nationwide behind Conservative Rabbi David Wolpe of Los Angeles. Newsweek's rankings were based on success in congregational growth and inspiration, leadership in the community and within his denominational movement, and the ability to serve the spiritual needs of his congregation.

Lookstein has a vision of an open and centrist Orthodox Judaism which he defines as "a middle of the road philosophy of Orthodox Judaism that embraces the entire community", with "an uncompromising love of all Jews".

Controversy

President Obama's National Prayer Service
On January 21, 2009, Rabbi Lookstein was one of three rabbinical participants in the National Prayer Service at the National Cathedral, representing, loosely speaking, the Orthodox Jewish contingent. The Rabbinical Council of America (RCA), the primary American modern-Orthodox rabbinic association, initially took exception to his presence, stating that, "participation in a prayer service held in the sanctuary of a church is prohibited", and adding: "Any member of the RCA who attends such a service does so in contravention of this policy and should not be perceived as representing the organization in any capacity." After its initial statement was publicized, however, the RCA subsequently softened its stance. Rabbi Basil Herring, its executive director, issued a new statement, saying simply: "Rabbi Lookstein did not represent the Rabbinical Council of America in attending that service, and therefore, we have no comment on the matter."

Jewish conversions
A woman who was converted to Judaism by Lookstein was refused recognition as a Jew by an Israeli Rabbinical Court in Petah Tikva, Israel, part of an international controversy over just who outside of the official Israeli Rabbinate will have their conversions recognized in Israel. The controversy gained a significantly higher profile because Lookstein also converted Ivanka Trump, daughter of Donald Trump, prior to her 2009 marriage to Jared Kushner. It seemed that officials of the Israeli government, which sometimes does not accept conversions performed by "Orthodox rabbis not on its list of approved authorities." The rejection of conversions performed by Lookstein was condemned by the Jewish Agency for Israel, the large international NGO "responsible for the immigration ... and absorption of Jews and their families from the Diaspora into Israel," which accused the Chief Rabbinate of "undermining of the legitimacy of the Diaspora faith communities" including Orthodox rabbis outside of Israel.

RNC invocation
In July 2016, Lookstein accepted the invitation of Ivanka Trump, a member of his congregation, to offer the opening invocation at the 2016 Republican National Convention. After the invitation was made public, many Kehilath Jeshurun congregants as well as Ramaz alumni signed a petition requesting Lookstein to refrain from appearing at the RNC, condemning Trump's "racist, misogynistic rhetoric". Lookstein, responding to the uproar, backtracked, and in an e-mail sent out to the congregants, he explained that he was withdrawing from the RNC "in the interest of bringing our community together". His prepared remarks, which Lookstein also sent out, included the following benediction:

In the aftermath, some argued that the pressure put on Lookstein to withdraw was counterproductive, inferring, from the content of his prepared remarks, a subtle rebuke to then-nominee Trump.

References

1932 births
Living people
People from Manhattan
Columbia College (New York) alumni
Rabbi Isaac Elchanan Theological Seminary semikhah recipients
Yeshiva University alumni
American Modern Orthodox rabbis
Orthodox rabbis from New York City
20th-century American rabbis
21st-century American rabbis